The Olivia Tremor Control/The Apples in Stereo is a 1994 split single by the two Elephant 6 bands.

The two tracks by The Apples in Stereo would appear on the Science Faire compilation in 1996 while the two tracks by The Olivia Tremor Control were later collected and placed on the Singles and Beyond compilation in 2000.

Track listing

The Olivia Tremor Control Side
"Gypsum Oil Field Fire" - 3:40
"King of the Claws" - 2:10

The Apples in Stereo Side
"Time for Bed"
"I Know You'll Do Well"

Cover art

The single's artwork is a collage incorporating two figures and an abstract paisley design from the 1967 Bantam Books paperback edition of Thomas Pynchon's The Crying of Lot 49 (probably Oedipa Maas and the drummer of the Paranoids).

External links
Album art and liner notes at Optical Atlas

1994 EPs
Split EPs
The Olivia Tremor Control albums
The Apples in Stereo albums